The 21st African Championships in Athletics was held in Asaba, Nigeria from 1 to 5 August 2018 at the Stephen Keshi Stadium. It was the second time that Nigeria hosted this competition. 800 athletes from 52 African countries participated.

Medal summary

Men

Women

† There was an error in the official results showing Ghizlane Siba as the winner. This article and this photo show that the gold was actually won by Erika Nonhlanhla Seyama of Swaziland, followed by Hoda Hagras of Egypt and Ariyat Dibow of Ethiopia. The medal table was adjusted to show this correction. A different view with this article from CAA as well as this photo.

Medal table

References

External links
Official site
Medals Board 

 
African Championships in Athletics
2018
African Championships in Athletics
International athletics competitions hosted by Nigeria
African Championships in Athletics